Howling is a vocal form of animal communication.

Howling may also refer to:
 The Howling (franchise), the fiction franchise
 The Howling, the original 1977 horror novel
 The Howling (film), the original 1981 film loosely based on the novel
 Howling (2012 film), a South Korean film
 Howling, a fictional village in which the 1932 novel Cold Comfort Farm is set
 Howling (The Saints album), 1996
 Howling (The Angels album), 1986
 Howlin' (Jagwar Ma album), 2013
 "Howling" (Abingdon Boys School song), by Japanese rock band Abingdon Boys School
 "Howling" (Hitomi Yaida song), a 2000 single by Hitomi Yaida
 The Howling (EP), a 2007 EP by Within Temptation
 Teddy Howling (1885–1955), English footballer

See also 
 Howl (disambiguation)